Swimming  at the 2022 European Youth Summer Olympic Festival was held at the Sports park Swimming in Banská Bystrica, Slovakia from 25 to 29 July 2022.

Medal table

Medalists

Boys

 Swimmers who participated in the heats only and received medals.

Girls

 Swimmers who participated in the heats only and received medals.

Mixed

 Swimmers who participated in the heats only and received medals.

Participating nations
A total of 332 athletes from 44 nations competed in swimming at the 2022 European Youth Summer Olympic Festival:

 (2)
 (1)
 (2)
 (11)
 (1)
 (3)
 (2)
 (4)
 (8)
 (2)
 (8)
 (4)
 (8)
 (14)
 (14)
 (2)
 (15)
 (16)
 (8)
 (16)
 (5)
 (2)
 (8)
 (16)
 (2)
 (4)
 (12)
 (1)
 (4)
 (5)
 (1)
 (3)
 (16)
 (8)
 (12)
 (1)
 (12)
 (16)
 (10)
 (16)
 (4)
 (9)
 (16)
 (8)

References

External links
Results
Results book

European Youth Summer Olympic Festival
2022 European Youth Summer Olympic Festival
Swimming in Slovakia
2022